Dundee and the Culhane is an American Western drama series starring John Mills and Sean Garrison that aired on CBS from September 6 to December 13, 1967.

Synopsis
Dundee and the Culhane follows the exploits of two frontier lawyers who provided legal defense to their accused clients. Dundee, played by Mills, was an older English lawyer who travelled to the American Old West and partners with a young Irish-American lawyer, nicknamed the Culhane. The title of each episode ended with the word "brief", as in a legal brief.

The show attempted to combine the Western and legal show genres, but with little success.  CBS had bought it on the strength of its pilot, but after seeing a few additional episodes and scripts, network officials were convinced that the show was going to fail before it even got started. CBS decided in September to replace Dundee and the Culhane in December with a Jonathan Winters variety hour.

Cast
John Mills as Dundee
Sean Garrison as The Culhane

Episodes

Guest stars

John Anderson
Tige Andrews
John Drew Barrymore
Charles Bronson
Michael Burns
William Campbell
David Canary
Lonny Chapman
Dabney Coleman
Jack Collins
Michael Constantine
Cyril Delevanti
William Fawcett
Douglas Fowley
Clyde Howdy
Don Keefer
Ken Mayer
John McIntire
Ralph Meeker
Sam Melville
Stuart Nisbet
Simon Oakland
Warren Oates
Carroll O'Connor
John M. Pickard
William Phipps
Ingrid Pitt
Ford Rainey
Stuart Randall
Donnelly Rhodes
Bing Russell
Frank Silvera
Julie Sommars
Dub Taylor
Irene Tedrow
Mitch Vogel
William Windom
Dana Wynter

References
 McNeil, Alex. Total Television  (1996). New York: Penguin Books 
 Brooks, Tim and Marsh, Earle, The Complete Directory to Prime Time Network and Cable TV Shows (1999). New York: Ballantine Books

External links
 
Behind-the-scenes production photos Collection of crew member Stephen Lodge.

1967 American television series debuts
1967 American television series endings
1960s American legal television series
CBS original programming
English-language television shows
Television series by MGM Television
1960s Western (genre) television series
Television shows set in California
Television series by Filmways